The Companies Act 1929 (19 & 20 Geo.5 c.23) was an Act of the Parliament of the United Kingdom, which regulated UK company law. Its descendant is the Companies Act 2006.

Provisions
Forms made under the 1929 Act introduced the term "Companies Court", referring to the High Court, Chancery Division, when exercising its jurisdiction for company law matters (Re Tasbian Ltd (No 2) [1990] BCC 322, 324).

s 77(1) authorised the court in a compulsory winding up to direct the liquidator either to prosecute the offender himself or to refer the matter to the Director of Public Prosecutions. If it appeared to the liquidator in a voluntary winding up that any past or present director, manager or other officer of the company had been guilty of an offence in relation to the company for which he was criminally liable, section 77(2) required him to report the matter to the Director of Public Prosecutions. It also required the liquidator to give the Director of Public Prosecutions information and access to documents in his possession or under his control. If the Director of Public Prosecutions decided not to bring proceedings against the offender, the liquidator could do so himself though only with the leave of the court. This was a safeguard against the company's assets being wasted on frivolous or vexatious proceedings.

Repeal
This Act was repealed by section 459 of, and the seventeenth schedule to, the Companies Act 1948.

See also
UK company law
Companies Act

External links
Table A, amended by the CA 1929
Hansard debates

United Kingdom company law
United Kingdom Acts of Parliament 1929
1929 in economics
Repealed United Kingdom Acts of Parliament